Tiago full name Tiago dos Santos Roberto (born 21 March 1984) is a Brazilian footballer who plays as a forward.

Career
Born in São Paulo, Brazil, Tiago left for Corinthians Alagoano in 2003, played twice in the national cup. He did not play in 2003 Campeonato Brasileiro Série C. May 2004 he returned to São Paulo state and signed a 5-year contract with Paulista. He did not play in 2005 Campeonato Brasileiro Série B.

In January 2006 he left for Brunei DPMM. In February 2007 Tiago returned to Brazil and signed a contract with Extrema.

In mid-2007 he left for Mexican side Chiapas but mainly a player for its B Team in Primera División A.

In summer 2008, he left for Romanian Liga I club Gloria Buzău, played 5 times, he was fired for discipline problem.

In 2009, he returned to Brazil for Campeonato Paulista Série A3 club Força. He played twice in the state 3rd level and was sent off on the first match he played.

In February 2010, he was signed by Fluminense de Feira. He was released before the start of 2010 Campeonato Brasileiro Série D.

In June 2010 he was signed by Amparo for 2010 Campeonato Paulista Segunda Divisão. He played 6 matches in the state league, scored 3 times.

In January 2011 he was signed by Fast until the end of 2011 Campeonato Amazonense. In mid-2011 he left for Omani club Dhofar.

In 2012 Tiago returned to Brazil and signed a contract with Mogi Mirim, he was transferred to Sorriso in March and signed a contract until June 2012.

In 2013, he left for C.D. Águila.

References

 Youtube Video

External links
 Futpedia Profile 
 
 

Brazilian footballers
Brazilian expatriate footballers
Liga I players
Sport Club Corinthians Paulista players
Sport Club Corinthians Alagoano players
Paulista Futebol Clube players
Chiapas F.C. footballers
FC Gloria Buzău players
Fluminense de Feira Futebol Clube players
Association football forwards
Expatriate footballers in Brunei
Expatriate footballers in Mexico
Expatriate footballers in Romania
Footballers from São Paulo
Brazilian expatriate sportspeople in Brunei
1984 births
Living people
DPMM FC players